Wikimedia Bangladesh Foundation (mostly known as Wikimedia Bangladesh or WikimediaBD) is a registered charity established to support volunteers in Bangladesh who work on Wikimedia projects such as Wikipedia. It is a Wikimedia chapter approved by the Wikimedia Foundation which owns and hosts those projects. As of 19 November 2019, it is the only official Wikimedia chapter in South Asia and the only chapter that operates in a Bengali-speaking environment.

The chapter has several collaborations with other institutions and has organised events for volunteers aimed at adding content to Foundation projects.

History
Wikimedia Bangladesh was approved by Wikimedia Board of trustees on 3 October 2011, and was the 39th local chapter to be approved by the Wikimedia Foundation board. In May 2012, the organization applied to Registrar of Joint Stock Companies And Firms for local registration. It was registered locally on 9 June 2014 under the Societies Registration Act of Bangladesh and its official name is Wikimedia Bangladesh Foundation.

Board of trustees
As of 2022 the Board members comprises:
 Shabab Mustafa (President)
 Ankan Ghosh Dastider (General Secretary)
 Masum Al-Hasan (Treasurer)
 Tanvir Rahman (member)
 Ali Haidar Khan (member) 
 Tanweer Morshed (member)
 Moheen Reeyad (member)
 Subrata Roy (member)

Activities
Wikimedia Bangladesh runs various voluntary education programs such as workshops, photo contests, article contests and conferences in Bangladesh to promote and enrich the Wikimedia Foundation projects. While Bengali language projects (such as Bengali Wikipedia) are the priority, it also helped with the launching of other regional language version of Wikipedia such as Santali Wikipedia and Bishnupriya Manipuri Wikipedia.

The organization also collaborates with other organizations and institutions such as Bangladesh National Museum, the Embassy of Sweden in Dhaka, Grameenphone for the enrichment of the Wikipedia project. When video piracy started in Bangladesh by using Wikipedia Zero in 2016, it worked jointly with the Wikimedia Foundation to raise awareness among the users. In 2017 Bangladesh Air Force release their photos to Wikimedia Commons, and in 2019 Jago FM provides photographs of media personalities for the same purpose.

See also
 List of Wikimedia chapters

References

External links 

 
 Wikimedia BD Blog

 
2011 establishments in Bangladesh
Organizations established in 2011
Charities based in Bangladesh
Wiki communities
Wikimedia Foundation
Educational foundations
Foundations based in Bangladesh